Mark Wise may refer to:
 Mark B. Wise, Canadian-American theoretical physicist
 Mark R. Wise, United States Marine Corps general